Han Nijssen (1935– 2013) was a Dutch ichthyologist.

Nijssen was born in Amsterdam and obtained his PhD at the University of Amsterdam in May 1970 with the dissertation Revision of the Surinam catfishes of the genus Corydoras. Later he was a curator at Zoölogisch Museum in Amsterdam.
Nijssen worked extensively with fish from South America, and was the author of several species, e.g. Corydoras weitzmani and Corydoras xinguensis.
Collaborating with Isaäc Isbrücker he described, among others, the group Hypancistrus and the species Hypancistrus zebra and Corydoras panda.
He also collaborated with Sven O. Kullander.

Taxa named in his honor 
The species Corydoras nijsseni and Apistogramma nijsseni are named after him.
Metaloricaria nijsseni is named after him.
Leporinus nijsseni

Publications (incomplete)
  Han Nijssen & S.J. de Groot, De vissen van Nederland. (1987)
  Sven O. Kullander & Han Nijssen, The Cichlids of Surinam: Teleostei: Labroidei  (1989)
  Han Nijssen, Veldgids Zeevissen ("Field guide for saltwater fish"), KNNV 2009,

See also
:Category:Taxa named by Han Nijssen

References

1935 births
2013 deaths
Dutch ichthyologists
Scientists from Amsterdam
University of Amsterdam alumni